FF Scala Sans is a humanist sans-serif typeface designed by Dutch designer Martin Majoor in 1993 for the Vredenburg Music Center in Utrecht, the Netherlands. It was designed as a companion to Majoor's earlier serif old style typeface FF Scala, designed in 1990. 

Like Eric Gill's 1927–30 design Gill Sans and Hans Eduard Meier's typeface Syntax, both upper and lower case are structurally modeled on serif old style faces. The lowercase roman a and g are two-story. FF Scala Sans italics are true italics, not sloped roman. The lowercase a, e, v and y are particularly calligraphic. FF Scala Sans is a very complete sans-serif in its inclusion of true small capitals, lining and non-lining (old style figures) and many ligatures. In 1993 an additional condensed width of the typeface was released. The typefaces are available through Font Shop International.

The typeface is prominently used by the Los Angeles Metro, and the Hungarian weekly magazine Magyar Narancs.
FF Scala Sans is rarely used by Kwik Trip, most notably some of its signage. It is also used by the Museum of Contemporary Art Chicago, as well as the fifteenth edition of The Chicago Manual of Style, JBL Sound Systems, The Elements of Typographic Style by Robert Bringhurst; Nelson-Atkins Museum of Art in Kansas City, Missouri, the Saint Louis Art Museum, Shakespeare's Words: A Glossary and Language Companion by David Crystal, as well as Martin Majoor's official website. It is also used by Wizards of the Coast for Sidebar/Table Body in Dungeons and Dragons 5th Edition Modules as well as Dungeons and Dragons 5th Edition Character Sheets.

Bibliography 
 Lupton, Ellen. Graphic Design and Typography in the Netherlands: A View of Recent Work. Princeton Architectural Press: 1992. .
 Friedl, Frederich, Nicholas Ott and Bernard Stein. Typography: An Encyclopedic Survey of Type Design and Techniques Through History. Black Dog & Leventhal: 1998. .
 Bringhurst, Robert. The Elements of Typographic Style. Hartley & Marks: 1992. .
 Middendorp, Jan: Dutch Type, 010 Publishers: 2004, 
 Lupton, Ellen. Thinking with Type: A critical guide for designers, writers, editors, & students. Princeton Architectural Press: 2004. .
 Spiekermann, Erik; Middendorp, Jan: Made with FontFont, Book Industry Services (BIS): 2006, 
 Thi Truong, Mai-Linh; Siebert, Jürgen; Spiekermann, Erik: FontBook – Digital Typeface Compendium, FSI FontShop International: 2006,

External links

 FF Scala microsite A website fully dedicated to FF Scala
 Writing With Scala Typespecimen by Ellen Lupton (2005)
 www.martinmajoor.com Martin Majoor's official website
 My Type Design Philosophy by Martin Majoor (2002)
 Martin Majoor, type designer Interview by Peter Biľak (2003)
 Types and Characters: Martin Majoor Brochure by Nina Völlink (2007)
 Martin Majoor on fontshop.com
 Uses of FF Scala

Scala Sans
Scala Sans
Scala Sans
Unified serif and sans-serif typeface families
Typefaces and fonts introduced in 1993

de:FF Scala Sans